Stephen Easmon Davies (born 16 July 1960) is an English former footballer who played as a midfielder for Congleton Town, Port Vale, Northwich Victoria, Altrincham, and South Liverpool. His son is rugby international Marcus Holden.

Career
Davies played for Congleton Town, which was formed in 1901, (North West Counties League), before joining John Rudge's Port Vale in December 1987. He came on as a substitute five times, and started one game, in the 1987–88 Third Division campaign. He did not feature at Vale Park in the 1988–89 season, and was instead loaned out to Conference club Northwich Victoria in a three-month deal in February 1989. His contract with the "Valiants" was cancelled in July 1989, at which point he moved on to Altrincham (Conference) and then South Liverpool (Northern Premier League).

Personal life
Davies' father was born in Ghana and moved to Liverpool in the early 1950s. Davies is the second eldest of four children. His son is Cypriot cricket and rugby union international Marcus Holden.

Career statistics
Source:

References

1960 births
Living people
Footballers from Liverpool
Black British sportsmen
English people of Ghanaian descent
English footballers
Association football midfielders
Congleton Town F.C. players
Port Vale F.C. players
Northwich Victoria F.C. players
Altrincham F.C. players
South Liverpool F.C. players
English Football League players
National League (English football) players
Northern Premier League players